This is a list of Hungarian names for towns and communes in Mureș County, Transylvania, Romania.

Mures County
Hungarian exonyms in Mures
Hungarian
Hungarian
Exonyms
Hungarian